Promposal is an American reality docuseries that premiered on MTV on May 14, 2017, after season 10 of My Super Sweet 16. Every episode features a teenager asking for someone to be their prom date using elaborate stunts or themed fashion and choreographies.

Episodes

References

External links
 Promposal at MTV

2010s American reality television series
2017 American television series debuts
2017 American television series endings
MTV original programming